The third season of the medical drama series The Night Shift debuted on June 1, 2016 and concluded on August 31, 2016, on NBC in the United States. It is produced by Sachs/Judah Productions, and Sony Pictures Television with series creators Gabe Sachs and Jeff Judah serving as executive producers. This season contained 13 episodes.

The series follows the overnight shift at San Antonio Medical Center, where three of the surgeons have a connection to the U.S. military. Dr. Thomas Charles "T.C." Callahan (Eoin Macken), an ex-army medic who often butts heads with his former girlfriend, Dr. Jordan Alexander (Jill Flint) and the hospital administrator, Dr. Topher Zia (Ken Leung), also an ex-army medic. Meanwhile, Dr. Alexander hires a new intern, Dr. Shannon Rivera (Tanaya Beatty), while Dr. Drew Alister (Brendan Fehr) has returned stateside after an incident overseas. Other doctors that are on the shift include surgeons Dr. Paul Cummings (Robert Bailey Jr.), who struggles to come out of his father's shadow while developing possible romantic feelings for Dr. Rivera, and Dr. Scott Clemmens, a recovering alcoholic and head of the surgery department.

Cast

Main cast
 Eoin Macken as Dr. TC Callahan
 Jill Flint as Dr. Jordan Alexander
 Ken Leung as Dr. Topher Zia
 Brendan Fehr as Dr. Drew Alister
 Robert Bailey Jr. as Dr. Paul Cummings
 JR Lemon as ER Nurse Kenny Fournette
 Scott Wolf as Dr. Scott Clemmens
 Tanaya Beatty as Dr. Shannon Rivera

Recurring cast
 Esodie Geiger as Nurse Molly Ramos 
 Alma Sisneros as Nurse Jocelyn Diaz 
 Catharine Pilafas as Nurse Bardocz 
 Luke MacFarlane as Rick Lincoln 
 Merle Dandridge as Gwen Gaskin
 Jennifer Beals as Dr. Syd Jennings
 Sarah Jane Morris as Annie Callahan
 AnnaLynne McCord as Jessica Sanders
 Michael Cassidy as Sam
 Kyla Kenedy as Brianna
 Briana Marin as Nina Alvarez
 Mac Brandt as Mac Reily

Guest cast
Lindsey Morgan as Kryztal
Elizabeth Sung as Sumei Zia
Lance Henriksen as Clive
China Anne McClain as Lauren
Carla Gallo as Hannah

Production
Gabe Sachs revealed on Twitter that the first day of the writer's room for season 3 of The Night Shift was on November 17, 2015. Sachs said that shooting for the third season would commence in February, and later Jill Flint announced that filming would start on February 1, 2016. The sets began going up on December 15, 2015. Actors Robert Bailey Jr., Brendan Fehr, and Jill Flint arrived in Albuquerque, NM to begin filming on January 24, 2016. The first production meeting took place on January 27, 2016, and location scouting took place the day before. Production on the third season began on February 1, 2016 in Albuquerque, NM. 

For the third consecutive season, the show will be filmed at Albuquerque Studios, and filming is expected to take place from February to June 2016. The tax incentives offered were cited as the main reason for filming in New Mexico, rather than in San Antonio. The show will employ about 130 New Mexico-based crew members, and approximately 500 New Mexico background talent. The first scene of the season filmed on February 2, 2016. The show filmed in a casino for part of one episode. Creator Gabe Sachs has said that this season would be more San Antonio-centric than either of the previous seasons. The Pearl Brewery, a local brewery, would be where the characters hang out after work, as well as "little taco places." Also, the costume department purchased T-shirts from local San Antonio locales such as, "Hogwild Records" and "Tapes on Main Avenue," because Sachs thought that "it would be cool if characters wore them" on screen.

Casting
On July 15, 2015, it was revealed that Scott Wolf who portrays Dr. Scott Clemmens had been promoted to series regular for the third season. On January 21, 2016, Deadline reported that Jennifer Beals had been cast as a recurring character named Doctor Syd Jennings. She will be introduced in the season 3 premiere as a Major in the Army who "has worked with the Culture Support Teams (CST) in conjunction with Ranger and Special Forces." On February 2, 2016, actress Tanaya Beatty was cast as a new series regular named Dr. Shannon Rivera, a recent med school graduate who impresses Dr. Alexander enough to recruit her as her intern. Melissa Gilbert and Sarah Jane Morris will both be returning for the third season. 

Freddy Rodriguez, who portrays hospital administrator Michael Ragosa, revealed on Twitter that he would not be returning for the third season of The Night Shift, as he is starring in a new CBS drama pilot Bull.  Jeananne Goossen who portrayed Krista Bell-Heart, is also not returning for the third season; she says that she split "amicably" from the show. On March 21, 2016, it was revealed that 90210 alum AnnaLynne McCord had been cast as a recurring character named Jessica Sanders, "a striking and driven pharamaceutical rep who's always looking for a way to make a deal." She will first appear in the fifth episode of the season, and in at least 3 additional episodes. Lindsey Morgan will appear in a guest role as Kryztal, "a high-strung bride whose injury in a wedding-day accident reveals a deeper and more complicated medical problem."

Episodes

Broadcast
The Night Shift airs on Global TV in Canada, and on Universal Channel in Australia. On September 23, 2015, Season 1 premiered in India on Colors Infinity, and in Korea, season 3 episodes will premiere right after their U.S. airing on Olleh TV. The show premiered in the United Kingdom on January 12, 2016, on Sky UK.

References

2016 American television seasons